Mark Delaney may refer to:

 Mark Delaney (footballer) (born 1976), Wales international footballer
 Mark Delaney (boxer) (born 1971), English boxer
 Mark Delaney (canoeist) (born 1964), Great Britain whitewater slalom canoeist